Page County is a county located in the U.S. state of Iowa. As of the 2020 census, the population was 15,211. The county seat is Clarinda. The county is named in honor of Captain John Page of the 4th U.S. Infantry, who was mortally wounded in the Battle of Palo Alto.

Geography

Major highways
 U.S. Highway 59
 U.S. Highway 71
 Iowa Highway 2
 Iowa Highway 48

Transit
 List of intercity bus stops in Iowa

Adjacent counties
Montgomery County (north)
Taylor County (east)
Nodaway County, Missouri (southeast)
Atchison County, Missouri (southwest)
Fremont County (west)

Demographics

2020 census
There were 6,983 housing units, of which 6,212 were occupied.

2010 census
There were 7,181 housing units, of which 6,393 were occupied.

2000 census

At the 2000 census there were 16,976 people, 6,708 households, and 4,460 families in the county. The population density was 32 people per square mile (12/km2). There were 7,302 housing units at an average density of 14 per square mile (5/km2). The racial makeup of the county was 96.11% White, 1.66% Black or African American, 0.49% Native American, 0.48% Asian, 0.01% Pacific Islander, 0.49% from other races, and 0.77% from two or more races. 1.56%. were Hispanic or Latino of any race.

Of the 6,708 households 28.20% had children under the age of 18 living with them, 55.50% were married couples living together, 8.10% had a female householder with no husband present, and 33.50% were non-families. 29.90% of households were one person and 15.40% were one person aged 65 or older. The average household size was 2.32 and the average family size was 2.87.

The age distribution was 23.30% under the age of 18, 7.90% from 18 to 24, 26.30% from 25 to 44, 22.80% from 45 to 64, and 19.80% 65 or older. The median age was 40 years. For every 100 females there were 102.70 males. For every 100 females age 18 and over, there were 101.80 males.

The median household income was $35,466 and the median family income was $42,446. Males had a median income of $32,549 versus $21,526 for females. The per capita income for the county was $16,670. About 8.10% of families and 12.50% of the population were below the poverty line, including 17.90% of those under age 18 and 7.60% of those age 65 or over.

Communities

Cities

Blanchard
Braddyville
Clarinda
Coin
College Springs
Essex
Hepburn
Northboro
Shambaugh
Shenandoah
Yorktown

Townships

Amity
Buchanan
Colfax
Douglas
East River
Fremont
Grant
Harlan
Lincoln
Morton
Nebraska
Nodaway
Pierce
Tarkio
Valley
Washington

Population ranking
The population ranking of the following table is based on the 2020 census of Page County.

† county seat

History
A fire on December 11, 1991, heavily damaged the Page County Courthouse. The fire was believed to have started in the attic and spread throughout much of the building. Multiple area fire departments fought the blaze and saved the structure. Court services were relocated to several buildings in Clarinda and other areas of Page County as repairs were made to the courthouse. After  years of work, the courthouse was re-occupied in March 1994.

Politics
Just like Cass County, Iowa , Page County has long been a Republican stronghold going back generations. Franklin D. Roosevelt in his 1932 landslide was the only Democrat to win the county post-Civil War, and even he couldn't hold onto the county 4 years later despite winning in an even bigger landslide.

See also

National Register of Historic Places listings in Page County, Iowa
 Page County Courthouse
 USS Page County (LST-1076)
 Shenandoah Chamber of Industry Homepage

References

External links

County website

 
1847 establishments in Iowa
Populated places established in 1847